Wild Park is a   Local Nature Reserve in Brighton in East Sussex. It is owned and managed by Brighton and Hove City Council. It includes Hollingbury Castle, an Iron Age hillfort which is a Scheduled Monument, and Hollingbury Park golf course.

The park has views over Brighton. Species-rich chalk grassland is managed by sheep grazing. There is extensive woodland with a network of footpaths, large areas of scrub and a dew pond.

On 9 October 1986, two nine-year-old girls, Nicola Fellows and Karen Hadaway, were murdered by 20-year-old local roofer Russell Bishop in the Babes in the Wood murders.

References

Local Nature Reserves in East Sussex
Brighton
Parks and open spaces in East Sussex